Veralevuha is a village, just south of Kokamau on the northwest coast of Guadalcanal, Solomon Islands.

References

Populated places in Guadalcanal Province